The Norwegian Consumer Ombudsman is a government-appointed ombudsman in Norway for consumer affairs.

The office was established in 1973 with Inger Louise Valle as the first holder. The office of the consumer ombudsman sees to it that the marketing of goods and services is done in accordance with marketing law. Specifically, the office acts in the interests of consumers to seek to prevent market abuses in conflict with the provisions stipulated in or pursuant to the Norwegian Marketing Control Act. The Consumer Ombudsman, acting on her or his own initiative or on the basis of communications from others, encourages all businesspersons to conduct their activities in accordance with the provisions of the Act. The Ombudsman also seeks to ensure that terms and conditions are not used in any way that may harm consumers. The office of the Consumer Ombudsman received attention internationally since it ruled that the iTunes Music Store's contract terms violates Norwegian consumer and marketing law.

The ombudsman handles around 8,500 cases each year, both on its own initiative and stemming from complaints from consumer and business-holders. Decisions by the ombudsman can be appealed to the Norwegian Market Council.

Bjørn Erik Thon led the office of the Consumer Ombudsman from 2000 to 2010, and was succeeded by Gry Nergård. Her term of office lasts for six years.

References

External links
 The Consumer Ombudsman and the Market Council

Consumer Ombudsman
 Consumer
1973 establishments in Norway
Organizations established in 1973
Ombudsman posts
Consumer rights agencies